"Bandera Waltz" is a song written by O. B. "Easy" Adams.

It is a Western cowboy ballad. According to the book Country Music USA, it talks about "the famous Bandera Stampede in Texas".

This was the first song released by the Texas Top Hands on their own Everstate record label in 1949. The song became a regional hit and has since been considered "a dance hall classic".

Track listing

Jimmy Wakely version 

Jimmy Wakely released his rendition on Capitol in 1950 (cat. no. 1240, c/w "Pot o' Cold"). Billboard gave a positive review: "A sensational cowboy waltz is warbled to a turn by Wakely, smartly backed by smooth-playing combo."

Slim Whitman version 

Slim Whitman recorded his version, along with "Love Song of the Waterfall", "My Love Is Growing Stale", and "End of the World", in November 1951 at KWKH.

Whitman's first single for Imperial would be "Love Song of the Waterfall" coupled with "My Love Is Growing Stale", following by "Bandera Waltz" coupled with "End of the World".

Track listing

References 

1949 songs
1949 singles
1952 singles
Imperial Records singles
Jimmy Wakely songs
Slim Whitman songs